Tralee was a constituency in Ireland of the Parliament of the United Kingdom, returning one Member of Parliament (MP). It was an original constituency represented in Parliament when the Union of Great Britain and Ireland took effect on 1 January 1801. The borough constituency continued to be represented until it was disfranchised in 1885.

Boundaries
This constituency was the parliamentary borough of Tralee in County Kerry.

Members of Parliament

Note:
 a Member of the former Parliament of Ireland chosen by lot to sit in the UK House of Commons from 1801.

Elections

Elections in the 1830s

Vernon Smith was appointed as a Commissioner of the Treasury, requiring a by-election.

 On petition, tendered votes were allowed, altering total votes to 133 for O'Connell and 111 for Bateman, allowing O'Connell to be declared elected.

Elections in the 1840s

Elections in the 1850s

O'Connell's death caused a by-election.

Elections in the 1860s
O'Connell resigned, causing a by-election.

O'Hagan resigned after being appointed a Judge of the Court of Common Pleas, causing a by-election.

Elections in the 1870s

Elections in the 1880s

See also
 Wikipedia:WikiProject UK Parliament constituencies/Historic constituency names

References

The Parliaments of England by Henry Stooks Smith (1st edition published in three volumes 1844–50), 2nd edition edited (in one volume) by F.W.S. Craig (Political Reference Publications 1973)

Westminster constituencies in County Kerry (historic)
Constituencies of the Parliament of the United Kingdom established in 1801
Constituencies of the Parliament of the United Kingdom disestablished in 1885
Tralee
1801 establishments in Ireland
1885 disestablishments in Ireland